Domentziolus or Domnitziolus may refer to:

 Domentziolus (brother of Phocas), brother of Byzantine Emperor Phocas and magister officiorum
 Domentziolus (nephew of Phocas), brother of Byzantine Emperor Phocas, curopalates and general